Prospero autumnale, the autumn squill, an autumnal flowering plant of the family Asparagaceae, subfamily Scilloideae, is found in the Mediterranean region from Portugal and Morocco east to Turkey and the Caucasus, plus Great Britain. Despite being classified as a single species, it is actually a cryptic species complex, with a variety of cytotypes having been discovered which are phenotypically indistinguishable from each other.


Synonyms 

Scilla autumnalis L.
Anthericum autumnale (L.) Scop.
Ornithogalum autumnale (L.) Lam.
Genlisa autumnalis (L.) Raf.
Stellaris autumnalis (L.) Bubani
Hyacinthus autumnalis (L.) E.H.L.Krause in J.Sturm
Urginea autumnalis (L.) El-Gadi
Scilla pulchella Munby
Scilla gallica Tod.
Scilla racemosa Balansa ex Baker
Scilla dumetorum Balansa ex Baker
Scilla longipes Batt. in J.A.Battandier & L.C.Trabut
Scilla holzmannia Heldr.
Scilla scythica Kleopow
Prospero holzmannium (Heldr.) Speta
Prospero pulchellum (Munby) Speta
Prospero scythicum (Kleopow) Speta
Scilla cyrenaica (Pamp.) G.M.Barroso & al.
Prospero cyrenaicum (Pamp.) Speta

References

Scilloideae
Flora of Europe
Plants described in 1753
Taxa named by Carl Linnaeus